Aulia may refer to:
 Aulia (Bithynia), a town of ancient Bithynia
 Wali, Islamic saints